SS-Polizei Selbstschutz Regiment Sandschak (from German; "SS-Police Self-Protection Regiment Sandžak"), also known as the Krempler Legion was a Schutzstaffel (SS) unit established on the territory of Sandžak by the senior Waffen-SS officer Karl von Krempler in Axis occupied Yugoslavia. He went to the Sandžak region (named after the Ottoman administrative unit "Sanjak") in October and took over the local volunteer militia of around 5,000 anti-communist, anti-Serb Muslim men headquartered in Sjenica.

The SS-police "self-defence" regiment Sandžak was created by joining three battalions of Albanian collaborationist troops with one battalion of the Sandžak Muslim militia. The Germans could not provide uniforms, arms and equipment for more than one battalion of Muslims, so other Muslim fighters remained within units of Muslim militia. This formation was sometimes thereafter called the Kampfgruppe Krempler or more derisively the "Muselmanengruppe von Krempler". As the senior Waffen-SS officer, Karl von Krempler appointed Sulejman Pačariz as the formal commander of the unit, but as the key military trainer and contact person with German arms and munitions, he remained effectively in control. At one point around 2,000 members of the SS regiment operated in Sjenica. The supreme commander of all police forces was SS and Police Leader August Meyszner who was responsible only to Reichsführer-SS Heinrich Himmler regarding the police actions.

All newly recruited members of this police were sent for two-months military training to Raška and Vučitrn. They were trained by Volksdeutsche. Besides military training they learned German language, first military commands and later to speak German. They sang German March songs while they marched through populated places.

In August 1944 took part in operation Operation Rübezahl under command of 5th SS Mountain Corps. On 14 October 1944 Yugoslav partisans defeated the regiment during a surprise attack in which they took Sjenica and pushed it back to Duga Poljana,  to the east. This action marked the end of the unit in Sandžak, although Germans recaptured Sjenica on 25 October 1944. In November 1944, Pačariz together with his troops retreated to Sarajevo where the SS regiment was put under command of Ustaše General Maks Luburić. Pačariz was promoted to the rank of Ustaše Colonel.

In 1945 Pačariz was captured near Banja Luka, put on trial and found guilty for massacres of civilians. He was executed as a war criminal.

Annotations
Name:
Selbstschutz-Regiment "Sandschak".
"Police Self-Defense Regiment Sandjak" (Polizei-Selbstschutz-Regiment Sandschak).

References

Sources 
 
 

History of Sandžak
Montenegro in World War II
Serbia in World War II
World War II crimes in Yugoslavia
Albanians in Serbia
Kosovo Albanians
Albanian militant groups
Military units and formations established in 1943
Military units and formations disestablished in 1944
Sjenica
Anti-Serbian sentiment
1940s establishments in Serbia
Military units and formations of Germany in Yugoslavia in World War II